The ethmoidal nerves, which arise from the nasociliary nerve, supply the ethmoidal cells; the posterior branch leaves the orbital cavity through the posterior ethmoidal foramen and gives some filaments to the sphenoidal sinus. There are two ethmoidal nerves on each side of the face:
 posterior ethmoidal nerve
 anterior ethmoidal nerve

References

External links
 ufl.edu

Trigeminal nerve